Upfront Trance is a double album from DJ Matt Darey which was released in 2005.  The two-CD album consists of two DJ sets performed by Darey.

Track listing

Disc one
 Smith & Pledger – "Forever (Aspekt Mix)" – 7:42
 Yilmaz Altanhan – "Eighties (Özgür Can Remix)" – 6:13
 Whiteroom – "Someday (Original Mix)" – 8:19
 Ridgewalkers – "Find (Andy Moor Remix)" – 6:22
 Tilt – "The World Doesn't Know (Original Mix)" – 8:27
 Perry O'Neil – "Wave Force" – 6:31
 Li Kwan – "Point Zero (Matt Darey Mix)" – 6:30
 Art of Trance – "Mongoose (Tek^tonik Remix)" – 5:52
 Oliver Prime – "Mind Games (Original Mix)" – 6:11
 Sandler – "Theme Song (Original Mix)" – 7:30
 Robert Gitelman – "Children Of The Sun (Original Mix)" – 4:19
 Musikman – "Air (G&M Project Remix)" – 5:36

Disc two
 Ernesto vs. Bastian – "Dark Side Of The Moon (Original Extended)" – 7:06
 Blank & Jones – "Perfect Silence" – 4:01
 L.S.G. – "Netherworld (Oliver Prime Remix)" – 5:40
 Kyau vs. Albert – "Made Of Sun (KvA Hard Dub)" – 5:24
 Ratty – "Sunrise (Here I Am) (Mark Sherry 2005 Sunburst Remix)" – 5:38
 Adam White – "Ballerina (Matt Darey Remix)" – 5:13
 Matt Darey – "Liberation 2005 (Darey Vs. Woods Mix)" – 6:00
 Michael Splint – "Secrets (Broke My Heart) (Airbase Mix)" – 5:05
 ATN – "Miss A Day" – 5:54
 Lost Tribe – "Gamemaster (Michael Woods Mix)" – 7:31
 Lost Tribe – "Possessed (Matt Darey Mix)" – 6:17
 X-Cabs – "Neuro 04 (Original Mix)" – 6:11
 Martin Roth & Frank Ellrich – "The Orange Theme (Martin Roth Mix)" – 8:41

Matt Darey albums
DJ mix albums
2005 compilation albums